News is a 2005 Indian Kannada-language drama film directed and written by M. K. Maheshwar. The film stars Upendra along with Reemma Sen (in her Kannada film debut) and Renuka Menon in the lead roles. The film was produced by Sri Vidya Pictures.

The film released on 4 August 2005 to generally positive reviews from critics. However, the film failed commercially at the box-office. The critics commented that the plot elements of the movie had loose similarities with Malayalam movies like Iyer the Great and New Delhi.

Cast
 Upendra as Guru
 Reemma Sen as Pooja
 Renuka Menon as Divya
 Nassar as Devaraj, editor of Number 1, a newspaper
 Tennis Krishna as Gopala, film director
 Ashok as editor of Super News
 Avinash as Umesh
 Bank Janardhan as Gopala's father
 Anantha Velu as J. J. Patil
 Mandeep Roy as a doctor
 Bhagya Shree
 K. V. Manjaiah

Soundtrack
The music of the film was composed by Gurukiran.

References

External source

 Year 2005 roundup
 Upendra's top class in News

2005 films
2000s Kannada-language films
Indian action films
Films scored by Gurukiran
Journalism adapted into films
2005 action films